Date Bait is a 1960 American film directed by O'Dale Ireland. Filmgroup released the film as a double feature with High School Caesar.

Plot
U.S. film. Delinquent teenage drama! Two confused teenagers are in love and want to get hitched, but their uptight parents say, "no way!" The couple finds themselves on the sleazy side of town, where they are victimized by the new bride's hoodlum ex-boyfriend and his psychotic drug-addicted brother! Big trouble! The teens must also contend with other assorted criminals, including drug dealers and mobsters!

Cast 
Gary Clarke as Danny Logan
Marlo Ryan as Sue Randall
Dick Gering as Brad Martinelli
Carol Dawne
Jon Lindon
Gabe Delutri
Michael Bachus
Mildred Miller
Steve Ihnat
Chad Williams
Lemar Crast
Rita Guinan
Anton von Stralen
Trep Howard
Reggie Perkins as Title Song Singer (voice)
Johnny Faire as Singer (voice)

Soundtrack 
Reggie Perkins - "Date Bait Baby"

External links 

1960 films
American black-and-white films
1960 drama films
American drama films
Teensploitation
1960s English-language films
1960s American films